This is a list of lists of journalists.

By country 

 List of American print journalists
 List of Argentine journalists
 List of Armenian journalists
 List of Brazilian journalists
 List of Bulgarian journalists
 List of Canadian journalists
 List of English journalists
 List of Eritrean journalists
 List of French journalists
 List of newsreaders and journalists in France
 List of German journalists
 List of Haitian journalists
 List of Hong Kong journalists
 List of Indian journalists
 List of Italian journalists
 List of Malawian journalists
 List of Pakistani journalists
 List of Slovenian journalists
 List of South African journalists
 List of Sri Lankan journalists
 List of Swedish journalists
 List of Uruguayan journalists

Other by country 
 List of journalists killed during the War in Afghanistan (2001–14)
 List of journalists killed in Bangladesh
 List of journalists killed in Europe
 List of journalists killed in Guatemala
 List of journalists killed in Honduras
 List of journalists killed in India
 List of journalists killed in Assam (India)
 List of victims of the Sicilian Mafia (Italy)
 List of journalists killed in the Mexican Drug War
 List of journalists killed during the Balochistan conflict (1947–present) (Pakistan)
 List of journalists killed under the Arroyo administration (Philippines)
 List of journalists killed in Russia
 List of journalists killed during the Somali civil war
 List of journalists killed in South Sudan
 List of journalists killed during the Mahdist War (Sudan)
 List of journalists killed during the Syrian civil war
 List of journalists killed in Tajikistan
 List of arrested journalists in Turkey
 List of journalists killed in Turkey
 Timeline of reporters killed in Ukraine
 List of journalists killed in the United States
 List of journalists killed in Yemen

See also 
 Journalism
 Glossary of journalism